Melinoessa is a genus of moths in the family Geometridae erected by Gottlieb August Wilhelm Herrich-Schäffer in 1855.

Species
Some species of this genus are:
Melinoessa aemonia (Swinhoe, 1904)
Melinoessa amplissimata (Walker, 1863)
Melinoessa argenteomaculata (Strand, 1918)
Melinoessa asteria L. B. Prout, 1934
Melinoessa aureola L. B. Prout, 1934
Melinoessa catenata (Saalmüller, 1891)
Melinoessa croesaria Herrich-Schäffer, 1855
Melinoessa eurycrossa L. B. Prout, 1934
Melinoessa fulvescens L. B. Prout, 1916
Melinoessa guenoti Herbulot, 1981
Melinoessa horni L. B. Prout, 1922
Melinoessa midas L. B. Prout, 1922
Melinoessa molybdauges L. B. Prout, 1927
Melinoessa palumbata (Warren, 1894)
Melinoessa pauper Warren, 1901
Melinoessa perlimbata (Guenée, 1857)
Melinoessa pieridaria (Holland, 1920)
Melinoessa sodaliata (Walker, 1863)
Melinoessa stellata (Butler, 1878)
Melinoessa straminata (Walker, 1869)
Melinoessa subalbida Warren, 1905
Melinoessa tanyglochis L. B. Prout, 1928
Melinoessa tessmanni (Gaede, 1917)
Melinoessa torquilinea L. B. Prout, 1916

References

Ennominae